The English county of Cumbria is located in North West England and has a population of 496,200 (making it the 41st most populous county of England's 48 counties). Cumbria has an area of 6,768 km², making the county England's third largest county, and with only 73 inhabitants per km², it is the country's second least densely populated county. People from Cumbria are known as Cumbrians and they speak a variety of the Cumbrian dialect to the north, whilst a Lancashire accent is more prominent in the south (namely Furness, which was once part of Lancashire). Along with Lancashire to the south, Cumbria is bordered with Scotland to the north, the Irish Sea to the west, Northumberland to the north-east, County Durham to the east and North Yorkshire to the south-east.

Settlements

Carlisle is the largest and only city in the county, whilst Barrow-in-Furness (the largest town) is twice as large as the second largest town (Kendal).

The twenty most populous settlements in Cumbria are listed below.

Density
Cumbria as a whole is the second least densely populated county in England with only 73 people per square kilometre. Despite it being the third largest in area (6,768 km²), about a third of the county is taken up by the Lake District National Park. Below is a table listing each district by population density.

Ethnic groups
Below is a table noting the percentage change for each respective ethnic group between 2004 and 2005 compared with England as a whole. This table does not reflect how many people of each group reside in each district; large percentage increases in such places as Copeland and Eden often mean that a community could have just increased from 30 to 37.

Black
People of Sub-Saharan descent (i.e. Black Britons) are one of the county's smallest ethnic groups, with around 0.4% of Cumbria's population suiting this term (around 2,000 people) - England average is around 2.9%. Cumbria's black community is increasing by around 20% per annum (See above), making them one of the county's fastest growing ethnic groups. The vast majority of Cumbria's Afro-Caribbean community reside in the largest towns, and Black Africans now make up a larger percentage than Black Caribbeans. The percentage of Black people for each of the county's six districts is as follows: South Lakeland 0.6%, Allerdale 0.3%, Barrow-in-Furness 0.3%, Carlisle 0.3%, Copeland 0.3%, Eden 0.3%.

Chinese
At the time of the 2001 Census, Chinese made up the largest ethnic minority group in Cumbria, however over the following decade a number of South Asian (including Indians, Pakistanis and Bangladeshis), Eastern European and Black groups overtook the community in terms of size. Despite this there is still a 1,100 strong Chinese community in the county (roughly 0.2% of Cumbria's population) - England average is around 0.8%. Unlike the South Asian groups, the Chinese are very widely dispersed across the county. The percentage of Chinese people for each of Cumbria's six districts is as follows: Allerdale 0.2%, Barrow-in-Furness 0.2%, Carlisle 0.2%, Copeland 0.2%, Eden 0.2%, South Lakeland 0.2%.

Immigrant White
2.2% of Cumbria's population (10,700) comes under the Other White category - England average is around 4.7%, meaning white people with ancestry outside of the UK. A large portion of these are people originating from the Republic of Ireland (around 0.5%), as people originating from Northern Ireland (of which there are more) come under the term White British. Whitehaven has been noted to have historically had a population of Irish migrants. Southern Europeans have a strong presence along Cumbria's Western Coast, with the towns of Whitehaven and Workington having significant Italian and Spanish communities. Carlisle to the north is estimated to be home to over 1,600 Poles, as well as countless other Eastern European immigrants. Barrow-in-Furness is home to hundreds of Germans, white Canadians, Poles, and people from the former Yugoslavia, as well as the UK's most significant Kosovar community. Kendal being in a prime location has recently attracted many Eastern European immigrants, as well as many migrants of any race being attracted to work in the Lake District. The percentage of Other White people for each of the county's six districts is as follows: Carlisle 2.8%, South Lakeland 2.6%, Eden 2.3%, Barrow-in-Furness 1.9%, Allerdale 1.8%, Copeland 1.3%.

White British group
White British people constitute for the largest ethnic group by far in the county at 95.1% (or 470,900 people) - England average is 82.8%. The largest percentage of White British people are in the rural regions of the county, and to some extent the districts of Carlisle and Eden to the North. Every district of Cumbria has a faster than nationwide average of ethnic minority growth. In some cases the larger towns are seeing a greater increase in immigrants than the UK's largest cities. The percentage of White British people for each of the county's six districts is as follows: Copeland 96.3%, Barrow-in-Furness 95.9%, Allerdale 95.7%, Eden 95.3%, Carlisle 94.4%, South Lakeland 93.7%. According to the 2001 UK Census, 16,628 people were born in Scotland, representing 3.4% of the county's population, 3,471 were born in Wales and 2,289 in Northern Ireland.

Multiracial
People belonging to two or more races Multiracial make up 0.7% of the county's population (some 3,300 people) - England average is around 1.9% Mixed Race. The spread of people of mixed race in Cumbria is more or less equal. The percentage of Mixed Race people for each of the county's six districts is as follows: Allerdale 0.7%, Barrow-in-Furness 0.7%, Carlisle 0.7%, Copeland 0.7%, South Lakeland 0.7%, Eden 0.6%.

South Asian
The South Asian community in Cumbria has increased dramatically since 2001, and now stand at 1.1% of the population (around 5,600) - England average is around 6.0%, the largest sub groups of this are Indians and Pakistanis, with Bangladeshis and Other South Asians. The percentage of South Asian people for each of Cumbria's six districts is as follows: South Lakeland 1.5%, Allerdale 1.2%, Carlisle 1.1%, Copeland 1.0%, Eden 0.9%, Barrow-in-Furness 0.8%.

Religion

The information below is based on 2001 UK Census findings.

No Religion
The second largest group are those who categorise themselves as having "no religion". This group makes up 10.4% of the population of Cumbria (slightly higher at 11.0% in Carlisle, but lower than the 14.6% national average). The next largest group are those who, for whatever reason, opted not to state their religious affiliation, making up 6.9% of the population of Cumbria (7.8% in Carlisle and 7.7% nationally).

Buddhism
Cumbria is likely to be the only county in the United Kingdom where Buddhists constitute the second largest religion, where most areas of the country have Islam as the second largest religion. Some 810 Buddhists resided in Cumbria in 2001 (0.2% of the county's population). The largest buddhist centres and temples can be found in Ulverston and Carlisle, where hundreds of Buddhists live in the Kadampa Buddhist Temple and Uma Buddhist Centre respectively.

Christianity

Christianity is by far the largest religion in Cumbria, with 400,578 Cumbrians identifying themselves as Christians in the 2001 UK Census. This represents 80.7% of the county's population. However, like with the majority of the rest of the UK, Cumbria's Christian population has thought to have decreased dramatically since 2001, with recent surveys showing that only 53% of the country's population described themselves as Christian. For the Church of England (Anglican), most of Cumbria is in the Anglican Diocese of Carlisle. For Roman Catholics, Cumbria forms part of the Roman Catholic Diocese of Lancaster. There are over 130 churches located across Cumbria with the only cathedral being Carlisle Cathedral.

Islam
Islam, unlike in most areas of the UK, is not the second most common religion in Cumbria. In 2001, 747 people followed the religion (almost 0.2% of Cumbria's population), with the largest concentration of Muslims being found in Carlisle, Barrow and Kendal. The  designated mosque in Cumbria is the Great Border City Masjid in Carlisle (www.carlislemasjid.org), which is predominantly run and used by the city's first and second generations of British Bangladeshi community, also used by British Pakistanis, Turkish, Arabs and others. There are, however, rented-out buildings and prayer rooms in Keswick. Penrith and Whitehaven also have mosques.

List of districts

By population
 Carlisle - 108,274
 South Lakeland - 104,321
 Allerdale - 97,213
 Barrow-in-Furness - 67,099
 Copeland - 68,689
 Eden - 52,779

By area
 Eden - 2,142.36 km²
 Allerdale - 1,241.58 km²
 South Lakeland - 1,533.62 km²
 Carlisle - 1,039.30 km²
 Copeland - 731.74 km²
 Barrow-in-Furness - 77.96 km²

By population density
 Barrow-in-Furness - 861 / km²
 Carlisle - 104 / km²
 Copeland - 94 / km²
 Allerdale - 78 / km²
 South Lakeland - 68 / km²
 Eden - 25 / km²

See also

Demographics of the United Kingdom
Demographics of Barrow-in-Furness

References

Cumbria
Cumbria